The 1992 Kansas State Wildcats football team represented Kansas State University in the 1992 NCAA Division I-A football season.  The team's head football coach was Bill Snyder.  The Wildcats played their home games in KSU Stadium.  The 1992 season saw the Wildcats finish with a record of 5–6, and a 2–5 record in Big Eight Conference play.  The season ended with a loss against Nebraska in the 1992 Coca-Cola Classic.  This was not considered a post-season game.

The team played a Thursday night game on ESPN on November 5, 1992, against Iowa State.  The Wildcats had their first undefeated home season (5–0) since 1934.

Schedule

Roster

References

Kansas State
Kansas State Wildcats football seasons
Kansas State Wildcats footbal